is a passenger railway station located in the city of Itako, Ibaraki Prefecture, Japan operated by the East Japan Railway Company (JR East).

Lines
Nobukata Station is served by the Kashima Line, and is located 10.4 km from the official starting point of the line at Katori Station.

Station layout
The station consists of one elevated island platform with the station building underneath. The station is unattended.

Platforms

History
Nobukata Station was opened on 20 August 1970.  The station was absorbed into the JR East network upon the privatization of the Japanese National Railways (JNR) on 1 April 1987.

Surrounding area
Nobukata Post Office

See also
 List of railway stations in Japan

External links

 JR East Station Information 

Railway stations in Ibaraki Prefecture
Kashima Line
Railway stations in Japan opened in 1970
Itako, Ibaraki